Jacques Nguyễn Ngọc Quang (July 23, 1909 − June 20, 1990) was a Vietnamese Roman Catholic bishop.

Ordained to the priesthood in 1935, Nguyễn Ngọc Quang was named bishop of the Roman Catholic Diocese of Cần Thơ, Vietnam and ordained to the episcopate on May 5, 1965. He died in 1990 while still in office.

References

1909 births
1990 deaths